Wayne Jean Gaudet (born August 12, 1955) is a Canadian politician. He represented the electoral district of Clare in the Nova Scotia House of Assembly from 1993 to 2013. He is a member of the Nova Scotia Liberal Party.

Early life
Born in Concession, Nova Scotia, he graduated in 1977 with a Bachelor of Arts at the Université Sainte-Anne and then received a Bachelor of Education at Saint Mary's University. He later settled in Church Point where he worked as a teacher and a high school vice principal.

Political career
Gaudet was first elected in 1993, and appointed to the Executive Council of Nova Scotia on June 11, 1993, as Minister of Agriculture. Gaudet served in a number of other cabinet posts during the 1990s, including Minister of Human Resources, Minister of Housing and Municipal Affairs, Minister of Education and Culture, Minister of Business and Consumer Affairs, and Minister responsible for Acadian Affairs. He also served as Speaker of the House. He served as interim leader of the party from 2000 to 2002, after Russell MacLellan's resignation and before Danny Graham was elected leader. Gaudet also served as interim leader after Graham's resignation and before Francis MacKenzie's election.

On January 18, 2013, Gaudet announced that he will not be running in the next provincial election, in part due to the new electoral map.

Electoral record

|-
 
|Liberal
|Wayne Gaudet
|align="right"|3,392
|align="right"|64.68
|align="right"|
|-
 
|New Democratic Party
|Paul Comeau
|align="right"|1,326
|align="right"|25.29
|align="right"|
|-
 
|Progressive Conservative
|Jimmy Doucet
|align="right"|459
|align="right"|8.75
|align="right"|
|-

|}

|-
 
|Liberal
|Wayne Gaudet
|align="right"|2,803
|align="right"|48.53
|align="right"|
|-
 
|Progressive Conservative
|Arnold LeBlanc
|align="right"|1,622
|align="right"|28.08
|align="right"|
|-
 
|New Democratic Party
|Paul Comeau
|align="right"|1,269
|align="right"|21.97
|align="right"|
|-

|}

|-
 
|Liberal
|Wayne Gaudet
|align="right"|3,547
|align="right"|61.55
|align="right"|
|-
 
|Progressive Conservative
|Marc Boudreau
|align="right"|1,456
|align="right"|25.26
|align="right"|
|-
 
|New Democratic Party
|Don Melanson
|align="right"|760
|align="right"|13.19
|align="right"|
|}

|-
 
|Liberal
|Wayne Gaudet
|align="right"|2,705
|align="right"|43.76
|align="right"|
|-
 
|Progressive Conservative
|Paul Comeau
|align="right"|2,355
|align="right"|38.10
|align="right"|
|-
 
|New Democratic Party
|Don Melanson
|align="right"|1,078
|align="right"|17.44
|align="right"|

|}

|-
 
|Liberal
|Wayne Gaudet
|align="right"|2,950
|align="right"|47.28
|align="right"|
|-
 
|Progressive Conservative
|Guy LeBlanc
|align="right"|2,578
|align="right"|41.32
|align="right"|
|-
 
|New Democratic Party
|Vanessa Paddock
|align="right"|711
|align="right"|11.40
|align="right"|
|}

|-
 
|Liberal
|Wayne Gaudet
|align="right"|3,461
|align="right"|51.99
|align="right"|
|-
 
|Progressive Conservative
|Guy LeBlanc
|align="right"|2,854
|align="right"|42.87
|align="right"|
|-
 
|New Democratic Party
|Christian Collin
|align="right"|342
|align="right"|5.14
|align="right"|
|}

References 

 36th Conference of the Canadian Region of CPA, Regina, Canadian Parliamentary Review
 Entry from Canadian Who's Who

Nova Scotia Liberal Party MLAs
Speakers of the Nova Scotia House of Assembly
Acadian people
Living people
1955 births
Members of the Executive Council of Nova Scotia
Saint Mary's University (Halifax) alumni
21st-century Canadian politicians
Nova Scotia political party leaders